"Nuestro Amor" ("Our Love") is a song by Bachata singers Alex Bueno and Romeo Santos . It was first recorded by Alex Bueno on his studio album Queda Algo (2007). The duet was released in 2020. This single is not found on an album. Alex Bueno claimed that he and Santos recorded a song in 2017 for an album, however it never made it to Golden nor Utopia. Eventually the song was released in 2020.

Charts

References 

2020 singles
Romeo Santos songs
Songs written by Romeo Santos
Spanish-language songs
Sony Music Latin singles
2007 songs